al-Akhḍar (literally, the green) in Wadi Samad (22°50'37"N, 58°10'39"E, 577 m altitude) is an archaeological site in Mudhaibi Wilayat Sharqiyah, in Central Oman. This cemetery was inhabited from the Umm an-Nar to the Samad Late Iron Age and during Islamic times.

Overview

Sources
Paul Yule, Die Gräberfelder in Samad al-Shan (Sultanat Oman): Materialien zu einer Kulturgeschichte (2001), .
Paul Yule, Cross-roads – Early and Late Iron Age South-eastern Arabia, Abhandlungen Deutsche Orient-Gesellschaft, vol. 30, Wiesbaden 2014,  
Paul Yule, Valourising the Samad Late Iron Age, Arabian Archaeology and Epigraphy 27/1, 2016, 31‒71, ISSN 0905-7196
Paul Yule–Gerd Weisgerber†, The Cemetery at al-Akhḍar near Samad al-Shān in the Sharqīya (Oman), Der Anschnitt, 2015, 111‒78,

See also
 Archaeology of Oman

References

External links
http://heidicon.ub.uni-heidelberg.de/pool/oman

History of Oman
Archaeological sites in Oman